"Disculpa los malos pensamientos" is a rock song by the Mexican band Panda. It was released in March 2006 as the third single from the band's third album, Para ti con desprecio. The song talks about the anger and bad thoughts that are caused by a girl's actions. The song reached the MTV TRL in Latin America, known as "Los 10+ Pedidos", where it peaked at number one.
It also topped Los 100+ Pedidos del 2006.

The song was written by José Madero, the vocalist of the band.

Music video

The music video for the song debuted on March 4, 2006 on MTV Latin America in Mexico and South America. It was shot by Rodrigo Guardiola.

The video starts with the vocalist of Panda, José Madero, who arrives to his girlfriend's house (played by Mariana Quintanilla). She is carried by him throughout the video because she is appeared to be dead. Once inside the house, they have a dinner (during which he proposes to her) with her parents, who don't seem to notice she is dead. The parents also act like zombies maybe ignoring the reality of the situation. 

In reality, Mariana Quintanilla (the actress in the video) is the ex-girlfriend of the bassist, Ricardo Treviño.

The video was shot in an old and dirty house in Monterrey, Mexico.

Charts

2006 singles
Spanish-language songs
Panda (band) songs
Songs written by José Madero
2006 songs